Wilfred Hanbury (16 January 1887 – 9 January 1966) was a Liberal party member of the House of Commons of Canada. He was born in Brandon, Manitoba and became a lumberman and manufacturer.

Hanbury attended St. John's College in Winnipeg and became president of the Pondosa Pine Lumber Company and a director of J. Hanbury company.

He was first elected to Parliament at the Vancouver—Burrard riding in the 1930 general election after a previous unsuccessful campaign there in the 1926 election. After completing his only term, the 17th Canadian Parliament, Hanbury left federal politics and did not seek re-election in the 1935 election.

References

External links
 

1887 births
1966 deaths
Liberal Party of Canada MPs
Members of the House of Commons of Canada from British Columbia
Politicians from Brandon, Manitoba